Fred Leonard Blackmon (September 15, 1873 – February 8, 1921) was a U.S. Representative from Alabama.

Born at Lime Branch, Georgia, Blackmon moved with his parents to Calhoun County, Alabama, in 1883.
He attended the public schools in DeArmanville and Choccolocco, the State normal college at Jacksonville, Alabama (now Jacksonville State University, Douglasville (Georgia) College, and Mountain City Business College, Chattanooga, Tennessee.
He graduated from the law department of the University of Alabama at Tuscaloosa in 1894.
He was admitted to the bar in the same year and commenced practice in Anniston, Alabama.
Blackmon served as city attorney for Anniston from 1898 until 1902, and served as member of the State senate from 1900 until 1910. He served as chairman of the congressional committee for the fourth Alabama district from 1906 until 1910, when he resigned.

Blackmon was elected as a Democrat to the Sixty-second and to the four succeeding Congresses and served from March 4, 1911.
Blackmon had also been reelected to the Sixty-seventh Congress, but died in Bartow, Florida, on February 8, 1921. He was interred in the Hillside Cemetery, Anniston, Alabama.

See also
List of United States Congress members who died in office (1900–49)

References

Fred L. Blackmon, late a representative from Pennsylvania, Memorial addresses delivered in the House of Representatives and Senate frontispiece 1922

1873 births
1921 deaths
Jacksonville State University alumni
University of Alabama School of Law alumni
Democratic Party Alabama state senators
Politicians from Anniston, Alabama
People from Polk County, Georgia
Alabama lawyers
Democratic Party members of the United States House of Representatives from Alabama
19th-century American lawyers